California's 51st district may refer to:

 California's 51st congressional district
 California's 51st State Assembly district